The men's 200 metre freestyle event at the 2014 Commonwealth Games as part of the swimming programme took place on 25 July at the Tollcross International Swimming Centre in Glasgow, Scotland.

The medals were presented by Prince Edward, Earl of Wessex, Vice-Patron of the Commonwealth Games Federation and the quaichs were presented by Councillor Archie Graham, Board member Glasgow 2014.

Records
Prior to this competition, the existing world and Commonwealth Games records were as follows.

Results

Heats

Qualification swim-off

Final

References

External links

Men's 0200 metre freestyle
Commonwealth Games